Edward Haghverdian is an Iranian-Armenian poet, translator and journalist who is a member of the Writers Union of Armenia. Since 1970, Haghverdian has been living in Armenia and since 1980s, he spent most of his time translating contemporary Persian literary works into Armenian language.

Life 

Edward Haghvedian was born in 1952 in Tehran, Iran to Iranian-Armenian parents. His family originally came from the Iranian city of Khomein in Markazi province of Iran. He has finished his elementary education in "National School of Aras" and his high school education, in the Persian-language schools called «Farokh-Manesh», «Paydar» and «Oloum». Thereafter in 1970, he migrated with his family from his birthplace's country Iran to Armenia and settled in the city of Vagharshapat.

Literary activities

Translation 
Since 1980s, Haghverdian spent most of his time translating contemporary Persian literary works into Armenian language. He is the first person ever who translated the vast majority of modern Iranian literary works into Armenian and published them in Armenia and United States of America.

See also

Armenian literature 
Persian literature

References

External links
Some poems written by Edward Haghverdian on Shargh newspaper (PDF, in Persian)
Four poems written by Edward Haghverdain on Farhikhtegan newspaper (in Persian)

Iranian people of Armenian descent
Living people
1952 births
20th-century Armenian poets
20th-century Iranian poets
Iranian translators
Armenian translators
Armenian journalists
Iranian journalists
People from Tehran
People from Markazi Province
People from Vagharshapat
Translators to Armenian
Translators from Persian
Armenian male poets
20th-century male writers
Iranian emigrants to the Soviet Union
21st-century Iranian poets